David Jeremy Darroch (born 18 July 1962) is an English businessman who was the CEO of Sky from December 2007 until becoming executive chairman in January 2021.

Early life
He was born and brought up in Alnwick, Northumberland, the son of a tax inspector, and the grandson of a miner. He attended Dukes Grammar School (a boys-only grammar school which became Dukes Middle School in 1977) in Alnwick.

He has a bachelor's degree in Economics from the University of Hull.

Career
He worked for Procter & Gamble for twelve years from 1988, eventually becoming European finance director of its healthcare business. He then worked for DSG Dixons Group under the aegis of Ian Livingston, before replacing him in the role of FD.

Sky
He joined Sky (previously known as Sky plc before Comcast's takeover in 2018, and British Sky Broadcasting before the European acquisitions in 2014) in August 2004 as Chief Financial Officer. He became Chief Executive of Sky in December 2007 and sold the organisation to Comcast in 2018. In 2017, Darroch was the UK's 4th highest earning CEO, receiving a salary of £16.3 million.

In January 2021, it was announced that Darroch would be standing down as CEO, and will become executive chairman of Sky, remaining in  post throughout 2021, and will then be an advisor to the company. He will be succeeded as CEO by Dana Strong.

Personal life
In July 2010 he received an honorary degree from the University of Hull. He is on the board of the Youth Sport Trust and the Council for Industry and Higher Education.

References

External links
 Sky leadership

1962 births
Alumni of the University of Hull
British television executives
English chief executives
British corporate directors
People from Alnwick
Living people
Sky Group